Out of Control is the fifth and final studio album by English-Irish girl group Girls Aloud, released on 31 October 2008 by Fascination Records. Like their previous albums, it was crafted by the production team of Brian Higgins and Xenomania. Out of Control builds on the sound of Girls Aloud's previous albums and represents a move into the mainstream for the group.

Out of Control debuted to positive reviews from contemporary music critics. The album debuted at No. 1 on the UK Albums Chart, Girls Aloud's first studio album to do so, and quickly became Girls Aloud's best-selling studio album. It was certified 2× platinum in the UK and Ireland. It yielded three singles, including chart-topping "The Promise", which was awarded Best British Single at the 2009 BRIT Awards.

Background
Girls Aloud announced they would begin work on their fifth studio album in May 2008, while on the Tangled Up Tour. Sarah Harding told MTV News in September that they had "been working on it all summer."

Brian Higgins said, "By the time we did the last album, it was different. They were so big then. They were ready to sell a million albums immediately, so they didn't need "Biology" or "The Show" or something a bit highbrow. They needed something that would hit you right between the eyes [...] The group has moved more and more into the mainstream, because that was what was required."

Girls Aloud's website describes Out of Control as "their most exciting and thrilling album yet." According to Kimberley Walsh, the album's title came from Girls Aloud's record company telling the girls, "We don't know what to say, you lot are out of control. We can't tell you anything." It also comes from a lyric in "We Wanna Party". Nicola Roberts revealed that the album was nearly titled Girls Aloud: Revolution, after the song "Revolution in the Head". The artwork for Out of Control was revealed on Girls Aloud's official website on 16 October 2008.

Music

Style and lyrics
Kimberley Walsh has said that the album is "a lot older sounding, which wasn't intentional, it was just kind of how it went." The girl group were very involved in the album's direction. "The '60s thing is quite prominent," Walsh told the BBC. "But it's out of the ordinary. Not really what you'd expect." Nicola Roberts said that the album also features a lot of 1980s-inspired electropop. Sarah Harding said that Girls Aloud "wanted to stay upbeat but try something a bit different and advanced. I don't think anything we've ever done has ever sounded the same. But we have that same vibe whatever we do because of our vocals." Nadine Coyle said the "aim from the beginning was to come up with songs that didn't sound like anything else out there." Walsh continued, "We want to impress the fans with what we do, so we've tried to up our game with this album and step outside the comfort zone."

Girls Aloud co-wrote four songs on the album: "Love Is the Key", "Miss You Bow Wow", "Revolution in the Head" and "Live in the Country". In particular, the bridge of "Love Is the Key" was written by Walsh.

Songs
The album's lead single, "The Promise", is a 1960s Spector-influenced number. Despite the popularity of 1960's pastiches, it was said that Girls Aloud's "go-for-broke, very modern re-imagining of Spector's wall of sound proves to be more authentic and entertaining than most other recent attempts". "The Loving Kind" is a collaboration with Pet Shop Boys. Neil Tennant said that they co-wrote the song while working with Xenomania, and described it as "beautiful but still dancey". Popjustice said that "the lyrics have the sadness and melancholy of a massive proper ballad but the production drags the song straight to the dancefloor and lends it an undeniable sense of optimism." The song has been compared to 2007's "Call the Shots", and has been referred to as both "a letdown sequel" and "the best thing they've ever done." "Rolling Back the Rivers in Time", which originally had a working title of "50s Sweetheart", was compared to Burt Bacharach. It features guitar from The Smiths member Johnny Marr, who also plays harmonica on "Love Is the Key".

"Love Is the Key", according to Digital Spy, "begins with the strains of a cathedral choir before lurching into a 1960s-style pop strut". It ends with "a bluesey harmonica solo in the outro." "Turn to Stone" was called an "icy electro banger", compared to "Róisín Murphy's moody kid sisters being remixed by 808 State". "Untouchable" is a six and a half-minute song that was called "fast, electronic and fantastic" with an immense build-up to the chorus. The song was said to recall New Order and "fuses blissful Balearic guitar lines with a pulsating techno throb". The song was later remixed and shortened for the single release. Track seven, "Fix Me Up", was compared to "the theme tune to a comedy sex film from 1975. In a good way." It contains a sample of Reuben Bell's "Superjock", written by Bell, Jerry Strickland, and Wardell Quezergue. "Love is Pain" was described by Popjustice as "an early-90s electronic sort of affair."

"Live in the Country" is a drum and bass track and "basically the sequel to 'Swinging London Town'" (from Girls Aloud's 2005 album Chemistry). It was described as a "drum and bass anti-anarchy anthem". "Miss You Bow Wow", it was stated, "could well be the most exhilarating song of the year, being almost ridiculously danceable, having a gloriously soaring chorus and some surreal lyrics". "Revolution in the Head", a reggae-influenced song, features pseudo-rapping from Nadine Coyle. The album's bonus track, "We Wanna Party", is a cover of a Lene Nystrøm track. Nystrøm previously co-wrote Girls Aloud's "No Good Advice" and "You Freak Me Out", and also has her own version of "Here We Go". Girls Aloud originally recorded the song for What Will the Neighbours Say?, but it was decided it did not fit.

Release
Out of Control was initially announced to be released on 10 November 2008, but the release date was moved forward a week to 3 November. The Irish release date came the Friday before on 31 October 2008. In addition to the album, an extra limited edition live album was released. Entitled Girls A Live, the bonus disc was available to purchase only from Woolworths. It features a number of live performances from Girls Aloud's tours. Additionally, a double-disc collector's edition of the album was released 8 December. The box set comes in a DVD-sized case and contains a bonus disc containing unreleased demos and interviews, as well as a 24-page booklet containing photos and lyrics to all of the songs.

Singles
The album's first single, "The Promise", was released as the album's lead single on 15 October 2008. The song is notable for its 1960s influence, with "production that tips its cap towards vintage Spector." The music video took place at a 1950s-and-1960s-inspired drive-in movie theatre, where a retro-styled Girls Aloud watched themselves channel The Supremes on screen. "The Promise" became Girls Aloud's fourth No. 1 upon release. It also earned the group their first ever win at the BRIT Award for Best British Single in 2009.
"The Loving Kind" was released as the album's second single on 12 January 2009. The music video, directed by Trudy Bellinger, was premiered on 3 December 2008. In the run-up to the single's release, commentators began to speculate that the song could possibly become the first single by the group to miss the top ten. However, "The Loving Kind" peaked at No. 10 on the UK Singles Chart, becoming Girls Aloud's 20th consecutive top ten single.
"Untouchable" was released on 27 April 2009, as the third and final single taken from Out of Control. "Untouchable" peaked at No. 11 on the UK Singles Chart becoming Girls Aloud's first and only single not to reach the top 10.

Critical reception

Out of Control received positive reviews from music critics. Aggregating website Metacritic reports a normalised rating of 63% based on nine critic reviews, indicating "a generally favorable" reception. It was described as "their most melancholy album to date". The Times wrote that Girls Aloud "show no sign of flagging in their quest to push the boundaries of the pop song" and noticed that they "continue to be as inventive as ever." BBC Music described Out of Control as "a shimmering album of heartbreaking electro pop" and exclaimed that it is "pop music at its finest." Digital Spy found it "smart, adventurous, emotionally resonant and often very, very catchy" and called it "an absolute delight" and Girls Aloud's "fourth terrific album in a row". MusicOMH noticed that it is "chock-full of those trademark, otherworldy electro-synth songs" and concluded by calling it "yet another excellent album from a group who may have risen from a lot of people's 'guilty pleasure' to becoming full-on national treasures". Slant Magazine hailed it as "one of the best pop albums of 2008" and said that Girls Aloud "are in a position where they can let the music do all the talking for them". NME praised the songs "Love Is The Key", "Rolling Back the Rivers in Time" and "Untouchable" and stated that although it is "not their best" effort, it is "more consistent than any British indie album released this year".

Yahoo! Music said that it "barely steers too far from their recipe for success", but more or less praised the album, awarding it seven out of ten. The Observer gave it three out of five stars, but felt that Girls Aloud raised the bar so spectacularly that this album "suggests that Xenomania's once-bottomless well of great ideas is running dry". The Guardian stated that "despite ear-catching touches [...], nothing hits the spot like the Phil Spector-like single The Promise". The Independent described Girls Aloud's output as "the musical equivalent of the lingering aftertaste of synthetic sweeteners", calling the album "meekly conformist pop."

The album appeared on Critic's Choice lists by Billboard contributors Keith Caulfield, Hazel Davis, and Mikael Wood.

In 2008, the album came top in Popjustice's Readers Poll 2008, beating Britney Spears' Circus. The lead single, "The Promise", came fourth, behind Spears' "Womanizer", which they later covered on their Out of Control Tour, MGMT's "Kids" and Sam Sparro's "Black and Gold". "The Promise" also won Best Number One Single and the group won Best Pop Act of 2008.

Commercial performance
Out of Control debuted in the Irish Albums Chart at No. 7, the highest debut of the week and their second highest charting in Ireland. It debuted in the UK Albums Chart at No. 1. This is their first studio album to achieve the coveted No. 1 position. The album Girls A Live also entered the UK Albums Chart at No. 29. Out of Control spent five weeks in the UK top five overall, and three additional weeks in the top ten. In the top ten albums chart of 2008, Out of Control came eighth, selling nearly 600,000 copies within just two months. On 4 January 2009, The Sound of Girls Aloud: The Greatest Hits re-entered the charts at No. 6 while Out of Control was No. 10, thus giving Girls Aloud two top ten albums at the same time.

Out of Control has sold over 800,000 copies.

Track listing
All tracks were produced by Brian Higgins and Xenomania. Credits adapted from the liner notes of Out of Control.

Personnel
Joe Auckland – strings, woodwind
Dick Beetham – mastering
Nick Coler – guitar, keyboards, programming
Miranda Cooper – keyboards, programming
Brian Higgins – producer
Tim Powell – keyboards, programming
Toby Scott – keyboards, programming, engineer
Sacha Collisson – keyboards, programming
Adrian Smith – strings, woodwind
Jeremy Wheatley – mixing
Neil Tennant – keyboards and backing vocals on "The Loving Kind"
Chris Lowe – keyboards on "The Loving Kind"
Johnny Marr - guitar on "Rolling Back The Rivers In Time", harmonica on "Love Is The Key"

Charts

Weekly charts

Year-end charts

Certifications

Release history

References

External links
Girls Aloud official website

2008 albums
Girls Aloud albums
Albums produced by Xenomania
Fascination Records albums